CPL Aromas is an international fragrance house, headquartered in the UK, with offices, and manufacturing centres around the world. CPL Aromas was founded in 1971 by the Pickthall family as an independent firm.

The company employs more than 600 people worldwide. The business' audited accounts for the fiscal year ending 31 March 2021 showed sales of 125 million dollars.

History
CPL Aromas was founded in 1971 by brothers, Michael and Terry Pickthall. The company's first site opened this year in Witham, Essex. Since then, the company has opened locations across the globe and employs more than 600 people worldwide.

1971 – Contemporary Perfumers Ltd was formed by Michael and Terry Pickthall, and the company's first site opened in Witham.

1980 – Barrington Hall was acquired as CPL Sales and Creative Centre.

1988 – The business formed its Aroma Ingredients Division, with a Flavours Division coming shortly after in 1989.

1990 – CPL Aromas established its Brixworth site as its European manufacturing facility and launched CPL Aromas Far East too.

1991 – CPL Aromas acquired H.E. Daniel Ltd and established in Germany and the USA.

1992 – CPL Aromas Latin America launched.

1994 – CPL Aromas was floated on the London Stock Exchange.

1995 – The acquisition of Du Crocq Aromatics, Netherlands and Daniel Blayn, France.

1999 – CPL Aromas' key innovation, AromaGuard technology, was launched.

2000 – CPL Aromas was delisted from the London Stock Exchange and restored back to the Pickthall family.

2001 – The Ingredients and Flavours divisions were sold to Frutarom, making CPL Aromas a fragrance-only fragrance house.

2005 – CPL Aromas FZE was established as the company's Creative Centre and Sales Centre in Dubai.

2007 – A new automated production facility was opened for CPL Aromas Far East.

2015 – AromaCore technology launched, and an automated production facility was established in Dubai.

2016 – Innovation House was established as the business' new Creative Centre.

2018 – CPL Aromas acquired dM Fragrances, which soon became CPL Spain.

2021 – CPL Aromas launched its new website and branding, and the company celebrated its 50th anniversary.

Locations 
CPL Aromas has sites in 18 international locations, serving customers in over 100 countries.

 The UK (Hertfordshire and Northampton)
 France (Paris)
 Spain (Vilassar de Dalt)
 Italy (Milan)
 Germany (Bielefeld)
 Turkey (Istanbul)
 Middle East (Dubai)
 India (Lower Parel)
 Far East (Myanmar, Thailand, Vietnam, Malaysia, Indonesia, China, Philippines, Taiwan, Korea)
 The US (New York)
 Latin America (Colombia)

The company also has manufacturing sites in the following locations:

 Brixworth (United Kingdom)
 Bogota (Colombia)
 Dubai (UAE)
 Hong Kong (China)
 Barcelona (Spain)

Sustainability initiatives 
The company compiles annual Sustainability Reports, developed in line with the Global Reporting Initiative core models and with the UN's Sustainable Development Goals, focusing its sustainability efforts on four areas: 

 The environment: Energy and emissions reduction, water stewardship, waste management
 Innovation: EcoBoost technology, product safety, economic performance
 People: Diversity and equal opportunity, health and safety, corporate responsibility
 Sourcing: Procurement practices, supplier assessment, sustainable purchasing agreements

CPL Aromas has also signed the Sri Lankan Sustainable Farming Agreement as part of the company's commitment to minimise environmental impact through water conservation and environment protection.

Notable projects 
The company is a partner of the Catholic Agency for Oversees Development (CAFOD). In 2020, this partnership reached its 20th anniversary.

CPL Aromas is the co-founder of the College of Fragrance for the Visually Impaired (COFVI), a charitable organisation.

The company participated in the founding of NAB Perfumery College in India, an educational initiative by the National Association for the Blind.

References

External links
 

Bishop's Stortford
Companies based in East Hertfordshire District
Fragrance companies
Manufacturing companies established in 1971
Cosmetics companies of the United Kingdom